Testosterona is the eighth album by Argentine rock band Bersuit Vergarabat, released in 2005. The album was recorded in El Cielito studio, Buenos Aires, Argentina, between April and May 2005.

Track listing
"Yo" [Me] (Subirá, Céspedes) [I] – 3:24
"Me Duele Festejar" [It Pains Me to Celebrate] (Cordera, Céspedes, Suárez) – 2:58
"En La Ribera" [At the Riverbank] (Cordera) – 4:56
"Sencillamente" [Simply] (Cordera, Martín, Céspedes) – 5:07
"O Vas A Misa..." [Either You Go to the Mass...] (Cordera, Céspedes, Martín) – 3:22
"Esperando El Impacto" [Waiting for The Impact] (Righi) – 3:36
"Andan Yugando" [They Keep Playing] (Subirá, Céspedes) – 3:15
"Madre Hay Una Sola" [There's Only One Mother] (Cordera) – 4:13
"Vamo' En La Salud" [Let's Go Healthily] (Verenzuela) – 2:53
"Inundación" [Flood] (Subirá, Céspedes) – 4:26
"Barriletes" [Kites] (Subirá, Céspedes) – 4:49
"Flor De Mis Heridas" [The Flower of My Wounds] (Subirá, Cordera) – 4:19
"...Y Llegará La Paz" [...and Peace Will Come] (Cordera, Céspedes) – 4:43

Personnel

Gustavo E. Cordera – lead vocals
Alberto Verenzuela – guitar, vocals
Oscar Humberto Righi – guitar
Carlos E. Martín – drums
Rene Isel Céspedes – Bass, backing vocals
Daniel Suárez – backing vocals
Germán Sbarbatti – backing vocals
Juan Subirá – keyboards

Charts and certifications

References

2005 albums
Bersuit Vergarabat albums
Albums produced by Gustavo Santaolalla